David Rudman (born June 1, 1963) is an American puppeteer, puppet builder, writer, director, and producer known for his involvement with the Muppets and Sesame Street.

Career
David Rudman has been a Sesame Street Muppet performer since 1985—currently performing Cookie Monster (since 2001), Baby Bear and the right head of the Two-Headed Monster (since 1998). He has received four Emmy nominations as Outstanding Performer in a Children's Series for his work on Sesame Street. Rudman has also directed several web videos for Sesame Street such as "Cookie Monster Auditions for Saturday Night Live" and "Conversations with Bert". He has performed in numerous television shows and specials including Saturday Night Live, The Colbert Report, The Tonight Show with Jimmy Fallon, Jimmy Kimmel Live! and The Muppets, where he performed characters originally portrayed by Richard Hunt, such as Scooter, Janice, Bobby Benson and Wayne. His film credits include The Muppets Take Manhattan, Labyrinth, Teenage Mutant Ninja Turtles, A Muppet Christmas Carol, The Adventures of Elmo in Grouchland, The Muppets and Muppets Most Wanted. Following the departure of Steve Whitmire in 2016, he became Beaker's new performer in 2017.

Personal life
Rudman attended Highland Park High School and graduated in 1981. He has been a speaker at the school's biennial Focus on the Arts program since 2003. He attended college at the University of Connecticut.

Rudman was the speaker at the 2005 graduation ceremony for the Illinois Institute of Art – Chicago.

Spiffy Pictures

Spiffy Pictures is a television production-channel company that started in 2003 and founded by David and Adam Rudman, located in Chicago, that consists mainly of its most famous live-action comedy-adventure-musical television shows for Noggin, Disney Channel, HBO Max, Comedy Central, Cartoon Network, Nick Jr., and PBS. 

In addition to his work on Sesame Street and with the Muppets, Rudman is co-owner of Spiffy Pictures where he co-created, executive produced, directed and performed in Jack's Big Music Show (Noggin), Curious Buddies (Nick Jr. Baby), Bunnytown (Disney Junior), Scooby-Doo! Adventures: The Mystery Map (Warner Bros.), Frankie and Frank (Nick Jr.), Donkey Hodie (PBS Kids) and is the creator, executive producer, character designer, director and voice director of the animated series Nature Cat on PBS Kids, voicing several characters including Leo the Mammoth, Prospector Jones, Nevin, and the Seeker.

Filmography
 I Love Liberty (ABC)
 The Muppets Take Manhattan (film): Additional Muppets
 Little Muppet Monsters (CBS): Boo Monster
 Labyrinth (film): Goblins (puppetry only)
 Sesame Street (PBS): Baby Bear, Cookie Monster (2001–present), Two-Headed Monster (right head), Norman, Davey Monkey, Ernestine, Chicago the Lion, Humphrey, Freddy (Rudy's dad), Additional Muppets
 The Tale of the Bunny Picnic (HBO): Snort, The Snail, Additional Muppets
 A Muppet Family Christmas (ABC): Miss Piggy's Photographer, Additional Muppets
 Jim Henson's Play-Along Video (direct-to-video): Danny, Dino Doc, Farmer Lear, Mookie, Additional Muppets
 Sesame Street: 20 and Still Counting (NBC): Additional Muppets
 The Cosby Show (NBC): Sweetums, Boo Monster
 The Jim Henson Hour (NBC): The Song of the Cloud Forest
 Teenage Mutant Ninja Turtles (film): Donatello (face)
 Muppet*Vision 3D (attraction): Roy and Max
 The Muppets at Walt Disney World (NBC): Frog, Additional Muppets
 Muppet Sing-Alongs: Billy Bunny's Animal Songs (direct-to-video): Percival Bear, Gopher, Termite, Waiter Penguin, Frog
 Sesame Street Visits the Firehouse (direct-to-video): Mr. Monster
 The Muppets Celebrate Jim Henson (CBS): Penguin, Additional Muppets
 Dinosaurs (ABC)
 The Muppet Christmas Carol (film): Old Joe (puppetry only), Peter Cratchit, The Swedish Chef, Wander McMooch, Beggar
 Dog City (Fox Kids): Bowser, Bram, Colonel Claghound, Additional Muppets
 CityKids (ABC): Frankie Frank, Additional Muppets, Muppet Coordinator
 Muppet Meeting Films (short): Big Head, Gimley, Jones, Additional Muppets
 A New Baby in the House (direct-to-video): Courtier
 Sesame Street Stays Up Late (PBS): Baby Bear, MNN Logo Orange Monster
 Muppet Time (Nick Jr.): Milton
 Mr. Willowby's Christmas Tree (CBS): Ned Mouse
 Donkey Hodie (PBS): Bob Dog, Grampy Hodie
 Muppets Sing-Alongs: It's Not Easy Being Green
 Muppets Tonight (Disney Channel): (Episode 201)
 Elmocize (direct-to-video): Twister Sister
 Aliens in the Family (ABC): Bobut
 Cookie Monster's Foodie Truck (PBS): Cookie Monster, Baby Bear
 Elmo Saves Christmas (PBS): Baby Bear, Humphrey, Elf #4
 123 Count with Me (direct-to-video): Humphrey 
 Elmo Says BOO! (direct-to-video): Baby Bear, Davey Monkey
 The Adventures of Elmo in Grouchland (film): Baby Bear, Alarm Clock Bird, Caterpillar, Pestie, Colander Stenchman, Grouch Ice Cream Customer, various Grouches
 Play with Me Sesame (Noggin): Cookie Monster, Ernestine, and Chicago the Lion
 Smart Cookies (PBS): Cookie Monster
 Kids Favorite Songs 2 (direct-to-video): Baby Bear, Lavender Anything Muppet boy, and Hero Guy (Hero Guy segment only)
 Elmo's World: The Wild Wild West (direct-to-video): Baby Bear and Hero Guy (Hero Guy segment only)
 Elmo's World: Happy Holidays (direct-to-video): Orange Gold Caroler, Cookie Monster and Baby Bear
 The Street We Live On (PBS): Cookie Monster, Baby Bear and Two-Headed Monster (right head)
 A Magical Halloween Adventure (direct-to-video): Pumpkin, Surprise Monster
 Happy Healthy Monsters (direct-to-video): Cookie Monster
 Cookie's Crumby Pictures (PBS): Cookie Monster
 Jack's Big Music Show (Noggin): Jack
 Elmo's Christmas Countdown (ABC): Cookie Monster and Baby Bear
 Studio DC: Almost Live (Disney Channel)
 Abby in Wonderland (direct-to-video): Cookie Monster
 A Muppet Christmas: Letters to Santa (NBC): Scooter, Janice and Luncheon Counter Monster
 The Muppets (film): Scooter, Janice, Miss Poogy and Food in the "We Built This City" montage
 Lady Gaga and the Muppets Holiday Spectacular (ABC): Scooter, Janice, Additional Muppets
 Muppets Most Wanted (film): Scooter, Janice, Miss Poogy, Bobby Benson, Wayne, Gulag Rat, Baby, Thingy-Thing
 The Furchester Hotel (BBC): Cookie Monster, Sorbet Monster, Gonger, Arthur, Mr. Smellsalot
 The Muppets (ABC): Scooter, Janice
 The Muppets Take the Bowl: Scooter, Janice, Beaker (Live show at the Hollywood Bowl, Sept. 8–10, 2017)
 The Not-Too-Late Show with Elmo (HBO Max): Cookie Monster, Baby Bear, Sully, Two-Headed Monster (right head)
 Muppets Now (Disney+): Scooter, Janice, Beaker, Miss Poogy
 Muppets Haunted Mansion (Disney+): Scooter, Janice, Beaker, Wayne, Squid Ghost
 The Muppets Christmas Caroling Coach: Beaker (voice, theme park show at Disneyland during Disney Merriest Nights in 2021)

References

External links
 
 Spiffy Pictures

1963 births
Living people
American male television writers
American male voice actors
American puppeteers
American television directors
American television producers
American television writers
American voice directors
Muppet performers
Sesame Street Muppeteers
Place of birth missing (living people)